

Paleo may refer to:

Prehistoric Era, Age, or Period 
 Paleolithic, a prehistoric Era, Age, or Period of human history

People
 David Strackany, aka "Paleo", an American folk singer-songwriter

Art, entertainment, and media
 Paleo (Buffy novel), a 2000 novel based on Buffy the Vampire Slayer
 Paléo Festival, an annual rock festival held in Nyon, Switzerland
 Paleo, a magazine published by Outside (company)

Diet
 Paleolithic diet

Political philosophy
 Paleoconservatism, a type of American conservatism
 Paleolibertarianism, a type of American libertarianism

See also 
 Palaio (disambiguation) modern Greek spelling of Paleo
 Paleontology
 Prehistoric